The Persian alphabet is the right-to-left alphabet used for the Persian language. It is a modification of the Arabic alphabet with four additional letters added: چ پ ژ گ.  It was the basis of many Arabic-based scripts used in Central and South Asia. It is used for the Iranian and Dari standard varieties of Persian; and is one of two official writing systems for the Persian language, along side the Cyrillic-based Tajik alphabet.

The script is mostly but not exclusively right-to-left; mathematical expressions, numeric dates and numbers bearing units are embedded from left to right. The script is cursive, meaning most letters in a word connect to each other; when they are typed, contemporary word processors automatically join adjacent letter forms.

History 
The Persian alphabet is directly derived and developed from the Arabic alphabet. The Arabic Alphabet was introduced to the Persian-speaking world after the Muslim conquest of Persia and the fall of the Sasanian Empire in the 7th century. Following which, the Arabic language became the principal language of government and religious institutions in Persia, which led to the widespread usage of the Arabic script. Classical Persian literature and Poetry were affected by this simultaneous usage of Arabic and Persian. A new influx of Arabic vocabulary soon entered the Persian language. In the 8th century the Tahirid dynasty and Samanid dynasty officially adopted the Arabic script for writing Persian, followed by the Saffarid dynasty in the 9th century, gradually displacing the various Pahlavi scripts used for the Persian language prior. By the 9th-century the Perso-Arabic alphabet became the dominant form of writing in Greater Khorasan. 

Under the influence of various Persian Empires, many languages in Central and South Asia that adopted the Arabic script use the Persian Alphabet as the basis of their writing systems. Today, extended versions of the Persian alphabet are used to write a wide variety of Indo-Iranian languages, including Kurdish, Balochi, Pashto, Urdu, Punjabi, Saraiki, Sindhi and Kashmiri. In the past the use of the Persian alphabet was common amongst Turkic languages, but today is relegated to those spoken within Iran, such as Azerbaijani, Turkmen, Qashqai, Chaharmahali, and Khalaj. With the Uyghur language in western China being the most notable exception.

During the colonization of Central Asia many languages in the Soviet Union, including Persian, were reformed by the government. Ultimately resulting in the Cyrillic-based alphabet used in Tajikistan today. See: .

Letters 

Below are the 32 letters of the modern Persian alphabet. Since the script is cursive, the appearance of a letter changes depending on its position: isolated, initial (joined on the left), medial (joined on both sides) and final (joined on the right) of a word.

The names of the letters are mostly the ones used in Arabic except for the Persian pronunciation.

Overview table 

Historically, in Early New Persian, there was a special letter for the sound .

Variants

Letter construction 

 The i'jam diacritic characters are illustrative only; in most typesetting the combined characters in the middle of the table are used.

 Persian yē has 2 dots below in the initial and middle positions only. The standard Arabic version  always has 2 dots below.

Letters that do not link to a following letter 
Seven letters do not connect to the following letter, unlike the rest of the letters of the alphabet. The seven letters have the same form in isolated and initial position and a second form in medial and final position.

Diacritics 
Other Arabic diacritics may be seen in Arabic loanwords in Persian.

Short vowels 
Of the four Arabic short vowels, the Persian language has adopted the following three. The last one, sukūn, has not been adopted. 

 There is no standard transliteration for Persian. The letters 'i' and 'u' are only ever used as short vowels when transliterating Dari or Tajik Persian. See Persian Phonology

 Diacritics differ by dialect, due to Dari having 8 distinct vowels compared to the 6 vowels of Iranian Persian. See Persian Phonology 

In Iranian Persian, none of these short vowels may be the initial or final grapheme in an isolated word, although they may appear in the final position as an inflection, when the word is part of a noun group. In a word that starts with a vowel, the first grapheme is a silent  which carries the short vowel, e.g. (meaning "hope").

Tanvin (nunation) 

Nunation is the addition of one of three vowel diacritics to a noun or adjective to indicate that the word ends in an alveolar nasal sound without the addition of the letter nun.

Tašdid

Other characters 
Technically, hamza is not a letter but a diacritic.

Although at first glance, they may seem similar, there are many differences in the way the different languages use the alphabets. For example, similar words are written differently in Persian and Arabic, as they are used differently.

Novel letters 
The Persian alphabet has four extra letters that are not in the Arabic alphabet: ,  (ch in chair),  (s in measure), .

Deviations from the Arabic script 

Persian uses the Eastern Arabic numerals, but the shapes of the digits 'four', 'five', and 'six' are different from the shapes used in Arabic. All the digits also have different codepoints in Unicode:

* However, the Arabic variant continues to be used in its traditional style in the Nile Valley, similarly as it is used in Persian and Ottoman Turkish.

Comparison of different numerals

Word boundaries 
Typically, words are separated from each other by a space. Certain morphemes (such as the plural ending '-hâ'), however, are written without a space. On a computer, they are separated from the word using the zero-width non-joiner.

Cyrillic Persian alphabet in Tajikistan 
As part of the "russification" of Central Asia, the Cyrillic script was introduced in the late 1930s. The alphabet remained Cyrillic until the end of the 1980s with the disintegration of the Soviet Union. In 1989, with the growth in Tajik nationalism, a law was enacted declaring Tajik the state language. In addition, the law officially equated Tajik with Persian, placing the word Farsi (the endonym for the Persian language) after Tajik. The law also called for a gradual reintroduction of the Perso-Arabic alphabet.

The Persian alphabet was introduced into education and public life, although the banning of the Islamic Renaissance Party in 1993 slowed adoption. In 1999, the word Farsi was removed from the state-language law, reverting the name to simply Tajik.  the de facto standard in use is the Tajik Cyrillic alphabet, and  only a very small part of the population can read the Persian alphabet.

See also 
 Scripts used for Persian
 Romanization of Persian
 Persian braille
 Persian phonology
 Abjad numerals
 Nastaʿlīq, the calligraphy used to write Persian before the 20th century

References

External links 

 Dastoore khat - The Official document in Persian by Academy of Persian Language and Literature

Persian alphabets
Arabic alphabets
Persian orthography
Alphabets
Persian scripts
Officially used writing systems of India